The 2012 Lakeside World Professional Darts Championship was the 35th BDO World Darts Championship organised by the British Darts Organisation, and the 27th staging at the Lakeside Country Club at Frimley Green. It ran from 7–15 January. 

The tournament was won by Christian Kist, an unseeded qualifier who was making his début at the event; Kist beat Tony O'Shea 7–5 in the final. Two-time defending champion Martin Adams lost in the quarter-finals against O'Shea. 

The defending women's champion Gulliver, a nine-time winner of the event, lost in the semi-finals to Anastasia Dobromyslova. Dobromyslova then beat Deta Hedman in the final to win her second world title. 

It was the first time that neither champion was from Great Britain (Christian Kist from the Netherlands and Anastasia Dobromyslova from Russia), despite both losing finalists coming from England (Tony O'Shea and Deta Hedman).

Both men's semi-finals were the subject of controversy. In the first, between Ted Hankey and Christian Kist, Hankey complained repeatedly about the air conditioning at the venue, claiming it was blowing his darts off course. Hankey later alleged that this was done deliberately, as he would be joining the PDC after the tournament. This was days after a similar incident at the rival PDC World Championship, which led to Adrian Lewis and James Wade walking off the stage due to a draft. Referring to that incident, Martin Adams, a BDO board member, had said before the Lakeside event started: “I can promise there will be no gusts of wind blowing across the stage.” Then, in the second semi-final, between Tony O'Shea and Wesley Harms, the players left the stage so the board could be replaced following 23 bounce outs.

Players from five countries including a record number of eight Dutch players took part in the tournament.

Format and qualifiers

Men's
The televised stages featured 32 players. The top 16 players in the WDF/BDO rankings over the 2010/11 season were seeded for the tournament.

The 32 players who qualified for invitation into the first round proper of the men's singles were:

Women's
The televised stages featured 8 players. The top 4 players in the WDF/BDO rankings over the 2010/11 season were seeded for the tournament.

The eight women qualified for invitation were:

Prize money
The prize money was £258,000 for the men's event and £16,000 for the women's event.
Men's Champion: £100,000
Runner-Up: £30,000
Semi-Finalists (2): £11,000
Quarter-Finalists (4): £6,000
Last 16 (8): £4,250
Last 32 (16): £3,000

Women's Champion: £10,000
Runner-Up: £2,000
Semi-Finalists (2): £1,000
Quarter-Finalists (4): £500

There was also a shared 9 Dart Checkout prize of £52,000, along with a High Checkout prize of £3,000 per event.

Results bracket
The draw for the tournament was made on 7 November 2011 live on ESPN.

Men's
 Match distances in sets are quoted in brackets at the top of each round. All sets are best of five legs, unless there is a final set tie-break. (The final set must be won by two clear legs; if it reaches 5–5, the 11th leg is decisive.)
The results are:

Women's
 All matches best of three sets, best of five legs.
The results are:

Statistics

Men

{|class="wikitable sortable" style="font-size: 95%; text-align: right"
|-
! Player
! Played
! Sets Won
! Sets Lost
! Legs Won
! Legs Lost
! 100+
! 140+
! 180s
! High Checkout
! Average
|-
|align="left"|  Christian Kist
| 5
| 25
| 15
| 93
| 67
| 179
| 133
| 33
| 129
| 92.45
|-
|align="left"|  Tony O'Shea
| 5
| 23
| 15
| 86
| 65
| 217
| 111
| 23
| 170
| 88.52
|-
|align="left"|  Wesley Harms
| 4
| 17
| 11
| 63
| 50
| 178
| 79
| 11
| 120
| 87.46
|-
|align="left"|  Ted Hankey
| 4
| 17
| 12
| 62
| 54
| 137
| 89
| 23
| 145
| 86.47
|-
|align="left"|  Martin Atkins
| 3
| 8
| 8
| 33
| 33
| 76
| 42
| 11
| 136
| 88.05
|-
|align="left"|  Alan Norris
| 3
| 8
| 10
| 27
| 40
| 91
| 42
| 22
| 130
| 90.33
|-
|align="left"|  Martin Adams
| 3
| 9
| 5
| 31
| 26
| 95
| 40
| 11
| 161
| 91.36
|-
|align="left"|  Paul Jennings
| 3
| 10
| 8
| 38
| 37
| 94
| 53
| 9
| 120
| 84.38
|-
|align="left"|  Scott Waites
| 2
| 6
| 5
| 25
| 22
| 68
| 26
| 5
| 156
| 87.73
|-
|align="left"|  Dean Winstanley
| 2
| 6
| 5
| 25
| 22
| 59
| 32
| 12
| 160
| 90.68
|-
|align="left"|  Robbie Green
| 2
| 4
| 5
| 16
| 19
| 41
| 18
| 9
| 76
| 86.20
|-
|align="left"|  Ross Montgomery
| 2
| 4
| 5
| 16
| 21
| 63
| 20
| 7
| 120
| 87.79
|-
|align="left"|  Willy van de Wiel
| 2
| 5
| 4
| 17
| 17
| 45
| 25
| 5
| 101
| 85.58
|-
|align="left"|  Geert De Vos
| 2
| 5
| 5
| 21
| 22
| 44
| 24
| 10
| 121
| 85.89
|-
|align="left"|  Steve Douglas
| 2
| 5
| 4
| 20
| 18
| 45
| 23
| 6
| 121
| 82.71
|-
|align="left"|  Gary Stone
| 2
| 3
| 4
| 15
| 16
| 36
| 23
| 7
| 120
| 88.23
|-
|align="left"|  Gary Robson
| 1
| 0
| 3
| 3
| 9
| 17
| 4
| 1
| 68
| 75.33
|-
|align="left"|  Jan Dekker
| 1
| 2
| 3
| 10
| 12
| 22
| 15
| 5
| 81
| 96.33
|-
|align="left"|  John Walton
| 1
| 1
| 3
| 9
| 9
| 19
| 13
| 3
| 97
| 86.94
|-
|align="left"|  Tony West
| 1
| 1
| 3
| 6
| 11
| 22
| 6
| 2
| 80
| 83.94
|-
|align="left"|  Benito van de Pas
| 1
| 2
| 3
| 9
| 12
| 26
| 11
| 3
| 119
| 90.18
|-
|align="left"|  Ron Meulenkamp
| 1
| 0
| 3
| 4
| 9
| 19
| 5
| 1
| 71
| 82.98
|-
|align="left"|  Clive Barden
| 1
| 2
| 3
| 8
| 12
| 20
| 11
| 2
| 160
| 79.86
|-
|align="left"|  Andy Boulton
| 1
| 1
| 3
| 6
| 11
| 22
| 11
| 1
| 65
| 88.74
|-
|align="left"|  Darryl Fitton
| 1
| 1
| 3
| 7
| 10
| 16
| 10
| 7
| 72
| 81.60
|-
|align="left"|  Scott Mitchell
| 1
| 0
| 3
| 4
| 9
| 18
| 10
| 0
| 16
| 79.48
|-
|align="left"|  Martin Phillips
| 1
| 1
| 3
| 6
| 11
| 27
| 6
| 2
| 65
| 79.38
|-
|align="left"|  Dave Prins
| 1
| 0
| 3
| 2
| 9
| 14
| 2
| 1
| 74
| 78.24
|-
|align="left"|  Fabian Roosenbrand
| 1
| 1
| 3
| 7
| 9
| 15
| 7
| 2
| 83
| 80.10
|-
|align="left"|  Joey ten Berge
| 1
| 1
| 3
| 7
| 11
| 21
| 8
| 4
| 92
| 86.70
|-
|align="left"|  Garry Thompson
| 1
| 1
| 3
| 7
| 9
| 18
| 10
| 4
| 118
| 84.30
|-
|align="left"|  Steve West
| 1
| 0
| 3
| 2
| 9
| 15
| 4
| 1
| 40
| 75.63
|-

Women
{|class="wikitable sortable" style="font-size: 95%; text-align: right"
|-
! Player
! Played
! Sets Won
! Sets Lost
! Legs Won
! Legs Lost
! 100+
! 140+
! 180s
! High Checkout
! Average
|-
|align="left"|  Anastasia Dobromyslova
| 3
| 6
| 1
| 20
| 8
| 45
| 13
| 0
| 90
| 72.71
|-
|align="left"|  Deta Hedman
| 3
| 5
| 4
| 19
| 20
| 47
| 12
| 3
| 119
| 75.71
|-
|align="left"|  Lorraine Farlam
| 2
| 3
| 3
| 14
| 14
| 37
| 11
| 1
| 125
| 70.92
|-
|align="left"|  Trina Gulliver
| 2
| 2
| 2
| 8
| 7
| 24
| 2
| 2
| 95
| 72.76
|-
|align="left"|  Karen Lawman
| 1
| 1
| 2
| 6
| 7
| 21
| 7
| 1
| 88
| 67.34
|-
|align="left"|  Rhian Edwards
| 1
| 1
| 2
| 5
| 6
| 9
| 9
| 0
| 155
| 73.70
|-
|align="left"|  Lisa Ashton
| 1
| 0
| 2
| 1
| 6
| 4
| 5
| 0
| 16
| 71.96
|-
|align="left"|  Julie Gore
| 1
| 0
| 2
| 1
| 6
| 8
| 0
| 0
| 50
| 63.39
|-

Broadcasting
The tournament was broadcast jointly in the UK by the BBC and ESPN. The BBC broadcast the afternoon session of the opening weekend, afternoon highlights from 9 to 13 January, the first semi final and the final. ESPN broadcast the evening session of the opening weekend, round two matches, the quarter finals, the second semi final and highlights of the final. The BBC's coverage was presented by Colin Murray with Bobby George being the pundit. ESPN's coverage was presented by Ray Stubbs and Nat Coombs. Commentary on both channels came from David Croft, Tony Green and Vassos Alexander. The tournament was also screened on Eurosport and Eurosport Asia in 99 other countries.

References

External links
 Official site
 Results

BDO World Darts Championships
BDO World Darts Championship
BDO World Darts Championship
BDO World Darts Championships
BDO World Darts Championships
Sport in Surrey
Frimley Green